Cylindrepomus bivittipennis is a species of beetle in the family Cerambycidae. It was described by Stephan von Breuning in 1955. It is present in Vietnam.

References

Dorcaschematini
Beetles described in 1955